Crasta is a surname found amongst the Mangalorean Catholic community of Portuguese descent.

Notable people

The following is a list of notable people with last name Crasta of the Mangalorean Catholic community.

 Richard Crasta, Indian American writer and novelist
 Karen Crasta, Indian Singaporean researcher and scientist

References

Karnataka society